Ángel García Yáñez (born 14 December 1967) is a Mexican politician affiliated to the New Alliance Party (Nueva Alianza). He will serve as a senator in the LXIV Legislature of the Mexican Congress from the state of Morelos. From 2015 to 2018, he represented the Fifth Federal Electoral District of Morelos, centered on Yautepec, in the Chamber of Deputies of the LXIII Legislature of the Mexican Congress.

Life
García Yáñez was the municipal president of the town of Zacualpan de Amilpas from 2009 to 2012; his selection as the PRI candidate was marked by controversy, with opponents claiming that he had not lived in Zacualpan in more than two decades and sparking confrontations that required the intervention of police from Temoac. In 2012, he ran for and won a seat in the LII Legislature of the Congress of Morelos from the local 17th district, including Zacualpan; he was the first ever deputy from the town and the first popularly elected local deputy from the Ecologist Green Party of Mexico (PVEM) in Morelos. He was one of the legislature's highest-ranking officials: he presided over the Board of Directors and three commissions, including Network of Municipalities for Health; Finances, Budget and Public Accounts; and Science and Technological Innovation. He also was the parliamentary coordinator for the PVEM in the legislature; he left the party in early 2015 because of pressure from the state party over his support for the state budget, choosing New Alliance as his new party and becoming its parliamentary coordinator.

In 2015, voters in the fifth district sent García Yáñez to the federal Chamber of Deputies; he was the only Nueva Alianza candidate returned to San Lázaro from a district for the legislature, and the first Nueva Alianza deputy candidate ever to win a district. He beat the PRD contender by 539 votes. He served on three commissions: Social Development, Infrastructure, and Agriculture and Irrigation Systems.
García Yáñez was elected to the Senate of the Republic for the LXIV and LXV Legislatures in 2018, as the first minority senator.

See also
 List of people from Morelos, Mexico

References

1967 births
Living people
Politicians from Morelos
Members of the Chamber of Deputies (Mexico) for Morelos
New Alliance Party (Mexico) politicians
21st-century Mexican politicians
Municipal presidents in Morelos
Members of the Congress of Morelos
Members of the Senate of the Republic (Mexico) for Morelos
Deputies of the LXIII Legislature of Mexico
Senators of the LXIV and LXV Legislatures of Mexico